Omiodes trizonalis is a moth in the family Crambidae. It was described by Hering in 1901. It is found in Indonesia (Lombok).

References

Moths described in 1901
trizonalis